The Mixed relay competition of the biathlon events at the 2012 Winter Youth Olympics in Innsbruck, Austria, was held on January 19, at Seefeld Arena. 18 nations took part in this event.

Results
The race was started at 13:00.

References

Biathlon at the 2012 Winter Youth Olympics